Nothofagus alessandrii, the ruil, is a species of plant in the family Nothofagaceae, commonly known as the southern beeches. It is endemic to Chile, occurring chiefly in the Chilean matorral ecoregion. It is threatened by habitat loss. The species is protected within Los Ruiles National Reserve.

Description
This is a deciduous tree with a straight, gray trunk that can measure up to 30 metres tall. Its leaves are ovate, ovate-cordate or lanceolate in shape, with conspicuous primary veins and serrated edges. The greenish flowers are unisexual and inconspicuous.

Distribution
The ruil grows between 37º 05' and 37º 50' south latitude, in the provinces of Talca and Cauquenes, in an area of about 100 square kilometres, but in a total area in 1991 totaled over 3.5 km2. According to 1988 studies, the species is scattered in about 185 land-holdings, each of which have one or two hectares and are surrounded by commercial plantations of Pinus radiata (an introduced species), and agricultural croplands and livestock for survival, hindering the expansion of its habitat. The only place where the species is protected by the state is the National Reserve Ruiles created for the express purpose of protecting it.

Hybrids
 Ruil hybridises with the red beech tree (Nothofagus fusca) from New Zealand to form the hybrid species Nothofagus × eugenananus.

Sources
 C. Michael Hogan & World Wildlife Fund. 2013. Chilean matorral. ed. M.McGinley. Encyclopedia of Earth. National Council for Science and the Environment. Washington DC

References

Nothofagaceae
Endemic flora of Chile
Chilean Matorral
Critically endangered plants
Taxonomy articles created by Polbot